We Are the Physics was an indie band from Glasgow, Scotland. The band drew influences from new wave, pop, indie, and math rock, and had a "B-movie" aesthetic.

History
We Are the Physics hailed from Glasgow, Scotland, and were founded in 2005. Originally known as We Are the Physics Club And Therefore, Everything We Say Is Fact, the quartet claim inspiration from bands such as Devo, The Skids, Polysics, Buddy Holly and Ex Models, and described their sound as "mutant science punk rock" (described by them as "...a way to make fairly derivative sound more interesting"). They have played gigs with Art Brut, Polysics, You Say Party! We Say Die!, Desaparecidos (band) and Thirty Seconds to Mars and have appeared on Marc Riley's Brain Surgery on BBC 6 Music. In a concert review, the BBC said of vocalist Michael M: "he doesn’t actually sing so much as run around like one of those aliens from Mars Attacks".

In April 2008, We Are the Physics' video for their single "You Can Do Athletics, btw" (directed by Colin Kennedy) was released, featuring the band as patients in a 1960s style hospital being 'upgraded' by singer Michael M, dressed as a doctor, in order to destroy a 50-ft woman attacking Glasgow. The single was awarded 'Single of the Week' by Drowned in Sound in April 2008. This single preceded the band's debut album, We Are the Physics Are OK at Music, released through This Is Fake DIY Records in May 2008. A headlining tour commenced to promote it. The album was generally well received. The Independent's Simon Price described the album: "The majority of tracks on their debut album sound like the Dead Kennedys' "California Uber Alles" and Soft Cell's "Memorabilia" blended in a cement mixer: an unholy chaos of screeches and bleeps, clangs and shouts", while The Mirror described the album as "short, sharp and to-the-jugular". Drowned in Sound were less complementary, describing the album as "an entirely one-dimensional debut that will either become a favourite of attention-deficit sorts everywhere or be consigned to whatever shores all those unsold Ikara Colt and KaitO LPs washed up on".

In an interview at the T in the Park festival in 2008, the band said that they were already bored with the songs on their debut album, and were writing songs for their second album. The band has since been in the studio recording new tracks for their second album, some of which have already made their live debut.

In 2013 they announced indefinite hiatus via social media. The three Michaels from the group have since gone on to form a new band, "Slime City", 2017.

Discography

Singles
 Less Than Three (2006) One
 Fear of Words / This Is Vanity (2007) One
 You Can Do Athletics, btw (2008) This is Fake DIY

Albums
 We Are the Physics Are OK at Music (2008) This is Fake DIY
 Your Friend, The Atom (2012)

References

External links
 Official website
 This is Fake DIY REcords
 Kane, Jon (2008) "Interview: We Are the Physics", NME

Reviews
McKinley, Fiona (2008) "We Are the Physics - We Are the Physics Are OK At Music (This Is Fake DIY)", MusicOMH

Scottish indie rock groups
Musical groups established in 2005
Musical groups disestablished in 2013